The Kunstpreis Rheinland-Pfalz is a prize awarded annually by the German state of Rheinland-Pfalz for outstanding achievement in the arts and alternates between the areas of visual arts, music, theatre, performing arts, film, and literature. The recipients must have a connection to the state either by birth, residence or their artistic work there and are selected by a jury. The prize was established in 1956 with the sculptor Emy Roeder as its first recipient. As of 2019, the main prize is an award of €10,000. There is also a Förderpreise (support prize) of €7,500 for outstanding young artists.

Past recipients
Past recipients include:
1956 – Emy Roeder, sculptor
1957 – Carl Zuckmayer, writer
1975 – Joseph Breitbach, writer
1977 – Volker David Kirchner, composer
1990 – Lothar Fischer, sculptor 
1995 – , sculptor and painter
2000 – Edgar Reitz, filmmaker
2002 – , dancer and choreographer 
2006 – , writer
2007 – Hansgünther Heyme, theatre director 
2008 – Fauré Quartet
2009 – Ursula Krechel, writer
2010 – Heiner Goebbels, composer

References

Arts awards in Germany
Culture of Rhineland-Palatinate
1956 establishments in Germany